Ledru-Rollin is a station on Line 8 of the Paris Métro. It is located at the intersection of the Rue du Faubourg-Saint-Antoine and Avenue Ledru-Rollin (after which it is named), on the border between the 11th arrondissement and 12th arrondissement.

History

The station opened on 5 May 1931 with the extension of the line from Richelieu – Drouot to Porte de Charenton. Avenue Ledru-Rollin is named after lawyer Alexandre Auguste Ledru-Rollin (1807–1874) who founded the newspaper La Réforme in 1843 and served as Minister of the Interior in 1848.

In 2013, 3,917,141 passengers used the station, making it the 128th busiest out of 302 on the Métro network.

Station layout

Places of interest

The Promenade Plantée, a 4.5 km long elevated garden along the abandoned railway which led to the former Gare de La Bastille railway station, is located nearby. The Opéra Bastille, also served by Bastille station, is also close to Ledru-Rollin.

References

Roland, Gérard (2003). Stations de métro. D’Abbesses à Wagram. Éditions Bonneton.

Paris Métro stations in the 11th arrondissement of Paris
Paris Métro stations in the 12th arrondissement of Paris
Railway stations in France opened in 1931